Piragu is a 2007 Indian Tamil-language crime drama film  directed by N. Jeeva. The film stars Hamsavardhan, Keerthi Chawla and Sunitha Varma, with Vadivelu, Dhandapani, Malaysia Vasudevan, Sabitha Anand, Emey, and Karate Raja playing supporting roles. The film, produced by R. Saravana and S. K. Chandhrasekar, had musical score by Srikanth Deva, cinematography by A. Kasi Vishwa, and editing by A. P. Manivannan. The film released on 21 September 2007.

Plot

Sathya (Hamsavardhan) is a drama director in his village who lives with his father Ramaiah (Malaysia Vasudevan), a respected Koothu artist, and his mother (Sabitha Anand). The village belle Thulasi (Keerthi Chawla), Sathya's relative, is in love with him since her childhood. Sathya comes to Chennai with hopes of becoming a cinema director one day. In Chennai, he lost his luggage and contact addresses. He is now is left penniless and has nowhere to go. Sofia (Sunitha Varma), a small mechanic shop owner, gives him food to eat and accommodates him in her mechanic shop. In turn, Sathya helps her repair motorcycles besides looking for a film producer. Afterwards, Sofia falls in love with Sathya. At last, impressed by Sathya's story, a film producer accepts to producer his film. The same day, Sathya saves David (Karate Raja) from being killed by local rowdies. The gang leader Antony (Dhandapani) commends Sathya for saving his brother from the rival gang rowdies and offers him to join his gang. Sathya declines Antony's proposal and speaks ill of his activity. Thereafter, Sathya's parents and Thulasi arrive in Chennai; they are accommodated by Sofia in her house. In the meantime, Antony and the rival gang leader Annapoorani (Emey) make peace and want to kill Sathya. What transpires next forms the rest of the story.

Cast

Hamsavardhan as Sathya
Keerthi Chawla as Thulasi
Sunitha Varma as Sofia
Vadivelu as Samarasam
Dhandapani as Antony
Malaysia Vasudevan as Ramaiah
Sabitha Anand as Sathya's mother
Emey as Annapoorani
Karate Raja as David
Chitra Lakshmanan as Film Producer
Crane Manohar as Production Manager
Sampath Ram as SP Sivakumar
Gana Bala as Mechanic
Lalitha Paatti as Sathya's grandmother
Anjali Devi as Antony's wife
Kong Kong as Samarasam's assistant
Shankar as Samarasam's assistant
Chelladurai as Police Officer
Bonda Mani as Beeda Shop Owner
Thambi Ramaiah
Thideer Kannaiah
Halwa Vasu
Muthukaalai
Kalidoss as Moneylender
Ravi Shanth as Elango
Sivanarayanamoorthy as Bayilvan Veeramuthu
Vijay Ganesh as Valakka
Marthandam
Subburaj
Amirthalingam
Rajmohan
Vengal Rao
Ragasya as an item number
Robert in a special appearance

Production
Actor Hamsavardhan, who shaved the head for the film, said, "If the script demands me to do some sacrifice, I am ready for it. At the end of the day, one would only want the end product to come out well".

Soundtrack

The film score and the soundtrack were composed by Srikanth Deva. The soundtrack, released in 2007, features 6 tracks with lyrics written by Na. Muthukumar, Piraisoodan, Devakumar, Muthumagan and Gana Bala. Gana Bala, credited as Anathai Bala made his debut as singer and lyricist with this film in the song "Pathinoru Aattam" and also appeared in the song.

Reception
The film critic Malini Mannath wrote, "A lackluster script and slipshod narration reveal the amateurishness of a debutant director who seems not quite able to translate his ideas on to the screen", and that, "The saving grace of the film is Hamsavardhan (son of yesteryear hero Ravichandran), who bravely strides on through all the inadequacies of the script and his lacklustre role".

References

2007 films
2000s Tamil-language films
Indian gangster films
2000s masala films
Indian crime drama films
Indian action drama films
Films shot in Chennai
Films shot in Malaysia
Films scored by Srikanth Deva
2007 directorial debut films
2007 action drama films
2007 crime drama films